Marko Lešković (born 27 April 1991) is a Croatian professional footballer who plays as a centre-back for Indian Super League club Kerala Blasters.

Club career
Lešković started his career playing at youth level for Osijek, with whom he signed a professional contract in December 2009. 

In the first part of the 2010–11 season he was loaned to Druga HNL side Suhopolje where he was featured in 14 games scoring four times. 

He returned to Osijek after the winter break and made his debut for the first team as a late substitute in the 2–1 win against Istra 1961 on 5 March 2011. He made one further appearance that season. In the 2011–12 season, Lešković was much more involved in the first team, making eight starts and eleven appearances off the bench. He scored his first goal in Prva HNL in a 2–2 draw with NK Zagreb on 20 March 2012.

In the 2012–13 season, Marko truly broke out as a player. He made 35 appearances for Osijek, playing in a range of positions including LB, CB and DM. He also scored four goals in the league as his side finished in 8th position. 

In the summer of 2013, Lešković finalised a transfer to HNK Rijeka, signing a four-year contract. Lešković managed 25 appearances in his first season. The following season, Marko made 41 appearances as Rijeka qualified for the group stages of the Europa League and finished runners up in the 1. HNL.

In July 2016, after three seasons with Rijeka, Lešković was transferred to Dinamo Zagreb.

In January 2021, Lešković was loaned out to NK Lokomotiva until the end of the season.

On 15 September 2021, Kerala Blasters announced that Lešković had joined the Indian Super League club on a one-year deal. He made his debut for the club on 19 November in the 2021–22 Indian Super League season opener against ATK Mohun Bagan FC, which they lost 4–2. He formed a formidable and successful partnership with Hormipam Ruivah and emerged as one of the best centre back pairs in the league. After a successful individual and collective season, Lešković signed a two-year contract extension for the Blasters until 2024 on 5 May 2022. On 11 November 2022, he scored his debut goal for the Blasters against the southern rivals Bengaluru FC, where he scored in the 25th minute as the Blasters won the match 3–2 at ful-time. Leskovic missed the match against Mumbai City FC on 8 January 2023  due to a muscle injury. Later on 21 January, the Blasters' head coach Ivan Vukamanovic confirmed that Leskovic has suffered small strain in his calf muscle and is expected to be out of action for a month. He came back from injury on 18 February 2023 against ATK Mohun Bagan in a 2–1 loss, by coming as a substitute in the 83rd minute for the goal-scorer Dimitrios Diamantakos.

International career
Lešković has represented Croatia at all youth national levels from U18 to U21. He made his debut for the senior national team against Argentina in 2014 and earned a total of 4 caps, scoring no goals. His latest international was a March 2017 friendly match against Estonia.

Career statistics

Honours 
Osijek
 Croatian Football Cup runner-up: 2012

Rijeka
 Croatian Football Cup: 2013–14
 Croatian Football Super Cup: 2014

Dinamo Zagreb
 Prva HNL: 2017–18, 2018–19
 Croatian Football Cup: 2017–18; runner-up: 2016–17, 2018–19
Croatian Football Super Cup: 2019

Kerala Blasters
 Indian Super League runner-up: 2021–22

References

External links

1991 births
Living people
People from Našice
Association football defenders
Croatian footballers
Croatia youth international footballers
Croatia under-21 international footballers
Croatia international footballers
NK Osijek players
HNK Suhopolje players
HNK Rijeka players
GNK Dinamo Zagreb players
NK Lokomotiva Zagreb players
Kerala Blasters FC players
First Football League (Croatia) players
Croatian Football League players
Indian Super League players
Croatian expatriate footballers
Expatriate footballers in India
Croatian expatriate sportspeople in India